Ganglau is a Madang language spoken in Madang Province, Papua New Guinea.

References

Yaganon languages
Languages of Madang Province